The 2018–19 Southern Illinois women's basketball team represents Southern Illinois University Carbondale during the 2018–19 NCAA Division I women's basketball season. The Salukis were led by sixth year head coach Cindy Stein. They play their home games at SIU Arena and were members of the Missouri Valley Conference. They finished the season 15–15, 8–10 in MVC play to finish in sixth place. They lost in the quarterfinals of the Missouri Valley women's tournament to Northern Iowa.

Roster

Schedule

|-
!colspan=9 style=| Exhibition

|-
!colspan=9 style=| Non-conference regular season

|-
!colspan=9 style=| Missouri Valley regular season

|-
!colspan=9 style=| Missouri Valley Women's Tournament

See also
2018–19 Southern Illinois Salukis men's basketball team

References

Southern Illinois Salukis women's basketball seasons
Southern Illinois